Roger Nygard (born March 28, 1962) is a film director, editor, and producer. As a director he has worked on Tales of the Unknown  (1990), High Strung (1991), Back to Back (1996), Trekkies (1997), and Suckers (2001). He also directed For Whom The Belt Tolls and What Would Jason Do?, episodes of The Bernie Mac Show, and Grief Counseling, an episode from the American television comedy series The Office.

His work as a film editor includes Emmy-nominated episodes The Table Read, an episode from the American television comedy series Curb Your Enthusiasm, and Chicklet, an episode from the American television comedy series Veep, and  Episode 102, an episode from the American television comedy series Who Is America?. He also edited episodes of Grey's Anatomy, The Comedy Store, and The White House Plumbers.

Background
Nygard was born on March 28, 1962, in Minneapolis, Minnesota.
His introduction into film making started at the age of seven when he found his father's 8mm camera. It had half a film roll left and with it he shot his first film.

Career
Nygard directed Trekkies which was released by Paramount Classics in 1999, as well as its follow up Trekkies 2 in 2004. He directed Suckers, a film which he co-wrote with Joe Yannetty. The film was a 2001 Video Premiere Award Winner in the Screenplay category. It was also an award winner in the "Special Jury Artistic Merit Award" category at the 2000 Cinequest Film Festival.

He directed and produced the 2010 documentary The Nature of Existence, which was described by The Hollywood Reporter as "his earnest attempt to find meaning in the universe." He spent four years traveling the world, conducting 175 interviews with an assortment of people from different backgrounds. Editing from 450 hours of footage was used for the final product.

In 2013, Nygard entered into a deal with Country Music Television to film a reality show pilot episode which would feature the family of Brother Jed an evangelist. Nygard first saw him preach at the University of Minnesota when he was attending the college.

He produced the 2020 documentary The Truth About Marriage, which was accompanied by a companion book. The Cinequest Film Festival called the film "...a powerful documentary steeped in philosophy, history, and psychology...." His second book Cut to the Monkey is about making and editing comedy series, and it was published in 2021 by Rowman & Littlefield.

Filmography (selective)

References

External links 
 

1962 births
Living people
American film producers
American screenwriters
American television directors
Film directors from Minnesota
American film editors